The 1996 D.C. United season was the teams debutant season in Major League Soccer (MLS), and 1996 was the inaugural year of play in MLS competition. United would become the first club to win the MLS Cup this year.

Background 

Prior to Major League Soccer's inaugural season, it had been six years since the Washington Metropolitan Area had a professional soccer club play within the region. The last team, was the late 1980s/early 1990s version of the Washington Diplomats. The Diplomats, played in the American Soccer League, which at the time was, by de facto, the top division of soccer in the United States although it was not sanctioned by U.S. Soccer or FIFA as a top tier soccer league. With the installation of the D.C. United franchise, it was the first time since the 1981 that a top division pro soccer club played in the region.

The foundation of the team came on June 15, 1994, when Major League Soccer selected Washington, D.C. out of twenty-two applicants to host one of the first seven teams, with three more added before the league's launch.

Club name 

Once an MLS franchise was awarded to Washington, the new club management sought a name for the club. Attempting to allude to the American sporting culture, original suppositions included the area's name followed by a mascot for the club. Some ideas included the "Spies", "Americans" and "Eagles". Eventually, the idea of simply naming the team "D.C. United" was decided upon as the club name. The moniker "United" alluded to European club names such as Leeds and Manchester United, as well as reflecting on being based in capital of the United States.

MLS regular season

The team got off to a slow start, losing its first three games in April, but improved during the season, including a four-match winning streak in August, and qualified for the playoffs.

MLS Playoffs 

The final month of D.C. United's inaugural season saw the club compete in the first ever MLS Cup Playoffs, eventually being crowned the MLS Cup champions. Ten days later, United earned the double by winning the 1996 U.S. Open Cup, the United States' domestic knockout cup competition. Such a feat would not be accomplished again until the Chicago Fire did so in 1998. To date, only four other MLS sides have ever achieved any sort of "double", being regular season, playoffs, or cup competition.

Playoff play continued into October with game three of the conference semifinal series, with kickoff on October 2. United, tied with the New York/New Jersey MetroStars were level 1–1 in the series. Played in front of a crowd of 20,423, United would emerge victorious in the match and in the series winning the match and series by a 2–1 scoreline. In game three, Steve Rammel opened the scoring in the 67th minute, giving United a crucial 1–0 victory. Inside 20 minutes later, the MetroStars leveled things up off an 86th-minute strike from NY/NJ's Antony de Ávila. The match, looking destined for sudden death extra time was abruptly halted when a penalty was called against NY/NJ in the box. The call resulted with United's Raúl Díaz Arce notching the eventual match winner in the 89th minute of play. The win booked United into the 1996 MLS Eastern Conference Finals.

D.C. United took on the Supporters' Shield winners, Tampa Bay Mutiny on October 10 to open up the Eastern Conference Finals. The first match of the three-game series was held at RFK Stadium, where United posted a 4–1 victory. The score was United's largest margin of victory throughout the playoffs. The match saw Díaz Arce notch a hat trick, making him the first player in MLS Cup Playoffs history to score a hat trick in a playoff match. Díaz Arce scored in the 38th minute to give United the go-ahead lead, only for Tampa Bay's Roy Lassiter to equalize in the 42nd minute. United's Steve Rammel score what would eventually be the match-winning goal in the 52nd minute to give United a 2–1 lead over the Mutiny. Díaz Arce would score insurance goals for United in a three-minute span, scoring in the 58th and 60th minutes of play.

Held two days later, game two of the conference finals took place at Houlihan's Stadium near Tampa, Florida. With a crowd of 9,339 on hand, Tampa Bay took a 1–0 lead against D.C. inside 15 minutes, thanks to a strike from Steve Ralston. Ralston's goal proved to be the difference between the two sides for the remainder of the first half. However, four minutes into the second half of play, United's Richie Williams netted the equalizer. Díaz Arce would, once again, provide last minute heroics scoring in the 82nd minute to give United the 2–1 lead, and to book themselves in the inaugural MLS Cup championship.

Match results

Major League Soccer

Regular season

Playoffs

Conference semifinals

Conference finals

MLS Cup

U.S. Open Cup

League standings

Conference

Overall

Transfers

In

Recognition

References

1996
Dc United
Dc United
1996 in sports in Washington, D.C.
1996
1996